Lelde Stumbre (born 30 January 1952) is a Latvian dramatist and politician. Author of many plays, she also wrote the screenplay to Lai tev labi klājas!, a 1995 TV series. She was a candidate for the Latvian parliament in 2011, but finished as the first runner up for her party in the Riga voting region. In 2014 Stumbre briefly served in the Saeima from 30 January to 20 March as a substitute for Einārs Cilinskis.

References

1952 births
Living people
People from Auce
National Alliance (Latvia) politicians
Deputies of the 11th Saeima
Latvian dramatists and playwrights
Latvian women writers
Women deputies of the Saeima

21st-century Latvian women politicians